Seth Powell (1862 – 3 February 1945) was a Welsh footballer who played at full-back for West Bromwich Albion in the English Football League. He made seven appearances for Wales in the 1880s and 1890s.

Football career
Powell was born in Cerney, near Wrexham, and played his early football in the nearby village of Summerhill. In 1883, he moved just over the border into England to become assistant schoolmaster at the Oswestry Board School.

He played for two Oswestry based football clubs; firstly with Oswestry White Stars with whom he won the Welsh Cup in 1884 and reached the final the following year. He then joined Oswestry Town where he remained until 1890.

His first international cap came on 23 March 1885 at the Racecourse Ground in Wrexham when the Welsh suffered an 8–1 defeat at the hands of Scotland, with Joseph Lindsay scoring a hat-trick. He was recalled to the side the following year for matches against Ireland and England.

Towards the end of the 1889–90 season, Powell joined West Bromwich Albion of the Football League on a wage of £2 per game plus expenses. He remained with Albion for two years during which they finished each season at or near the foot of the table. Whilst with Albion, he made a further four appearances for Wales, all of which ended in defeats.

Powell then spent a season with Burton Swifts without making any League appearances before moving to Chester, then playing in The Combination, before returning to Oswestry United.

Later career
From 1900 until his retirement in 1930, Powell was the district relieving officer for the Oswestry Board of Guardians. He also served Oswestry F.C. as secretary and spent twenty years in the 2nd Volunteer Battalion of the King's Shropshire Light Infantry.

International appearances
Powell made seven appearances for Wales as follows:

Powell also played in the first match against a touring Canadian XI in September 1891.

Honours
Oswestry White Stars
Welsh Cup
Winners: 1884
Finalists: 1885

References

1862 births
1945 deaths
Footballers from Wrexham
Welsh footballers
Wales international footballers
Association football defenders
English Football League players
Oswestry Town F.C. players
West Bromwich Albion F.C. players
Burton Albion F.C. players
Chester City F.C. players
King's Shropshire Light Infantry soldiers
Oswestry United F.C. players